Thiruvalanjuli is a village in the Kumbakonam taluk of Thanjavur district, Tamil Nadu, India. The village is known for the famous Kabartheeswarar Temple which houses the image of Vellai Vinayagar. It is the suburban region of business city of Kumbakonam.

The last inscription mentioning a Chera king of Makotai is found on south wall of the mandapa in front of the central shrine in Kapardiswara shrine, Thiruvalanjuli (dated in the regnal year of his overlord Vikrama Chola).

Demographics 
In the 2001 census, Thiruvalanjuli had a population of 10,955 with 5441 males and 5514 females. The sex ratio was 1013. The literacy rate was 71.51%.

References 

 

Villages in Thanjavur district